Michael Warner (born April 14, 1989 in Hamilton, Ontario) is a professional Canadian football offensive lineman in the Canadian Football League who is currently a free agent. He was drafted 32nd overall by the Toronto Argonauts in the 2010 CFL Draft and signed with the team on May 25, 2010. On June 20, 2010, Warner was released by the Argonauts. He played college football for the Waterloo Warriors.

On December 7, 2010, Warner was re-signed by the Argonauts. He was released by the Argonauts on June 8, 2011.

References

1988 births
Living people
Canadian football offensive linemen
Toronto Argonauts players
Sportspeople from Hamilton, Ontario
Waterloo Warriors football players